Georg Kühlewind, birth name György Székely (March 6, 1924 – January 15, 2006) was a Hungarian philosopher, writer, lecturer and meditation teacher, who worked from the tradition of Rudolf Steiner’s spiritual science. Setting aside his early interest in music and psychology, he pursued a successful professional career as a physical chemist. Meanwhile, he continued to deepen his spiritual practice and insights. A prolific author (most of whose works are still untranslated from German), Kühlewind spent much time traveling the world, lecturing and leading workshops and seminars in meditation, psychology, epistemology, child development, anthroposophy, and esoteric Christianity. He was the author of numerous books.

Works in English translation:

Stages of Consciousness - Meditations on the Boundaries of the Soul 1984
Becoming Aware of the Logos - The Way of St. John the Evangelist 1985
From Normal to Healthy - Paths to the Liberation of Consciousness 1988
The Life of the Soul - Between Subconsciousness and Supraconsciousness 1990
Working with Anthroposophy - The Practice of Thinking 1992
The Logos-Structure of the World - Language As Model of Reality 1992
Star Children - Understanding Children Who Set Us Special Tasks and Challenges 2004
Wilt Thou Be Made Whole? - Healing in the Gospels 2008

External links
Official website
Profile at Steiner Books

1924 births
2006 deaths
Anthroposophists
20th-century Hungarian philosophers
Hungarian Jews